King Kong: 360 3-D is an attraction which is included in the Studio Tour at Universal Studios Hollywood. The attraction takes guests to a recreated version of Skull Island from Peter Jackson's 2005 blockbuster remake King Kong. The attraction replaced King Kong Encounter which burned down in 2008. King Kong: 360 3-D made its debut on the Studio Tour on July 1, 2010.

Summary

After a video introduction by Peter Jackson, Studio Tour guests wear 3-D glasses as the tram enters a sound stage dressed as a re-creation of Skull Island. The sound stage is located in front of the Collapsing Bridge on the Studio Tour. Immediately upon entry the scent of a damp jungle is present. A pack of Venatosaurus see the tram and start to give chase. They scatter when a group of three Vastatosaurus rex turn up, and some of the pack get eaten. After the attack, the three Vastatosaurus rex begin to chase the tram, only to disturb Kong, who begins to fight them. The V. rexes try to attack the tram from both sides, while Kong jumps to each side to defeat them, as air and water effects are blown onto guests to further the illusion. Near the end of the experience, a V. rex gets a hold of what is supposed to be the last tram car and pulls it from the train, throwing it down a pit. Kong defeats the V. rex, roars in triumph, and jumps away, ending the experience.

History
A three-alarm fire broke out on the Universal Studios backlot on June 1, 2008. The Los Angeles County Fire Department had reported that King Kong Encounter, among other things, had burned down. In August 2008, Universal announced that instead of replacing the King Kong Encounter attraction with a new concept, as they had originally planned, it would instead be rebuilt as a new experience titled King Kong: 360 3-D. The ride scene was collaborated on by King Kong director Peter Jackson, as well as Weta Digital. The show is based upon a 3-D 360 concept by Peter Anderson. The system is an Immersive Transporter by Dynamic Structures.

Special effects
When the tram drives into the building of the 3-D attraction, it drives onto a motion based platform, which can make the tram tilt left and right, vibrate, and raise up and drop down. The theater is equipped with physical effects that enhance the experience such as wind, water, air blasts, the scent of King Kong's banana breath, and the motion.

Universal Studios Florida counterpart
In 1990, a ride called Kongfrontation was a similar ride. It closed in 2002, and was replaced by Revenge of the Mummy. However, a new Kong ride, Skull Island: Reign of Kong, opened on July 13, 2016 in Islands Of Adventure.

References

External links
YouTube POV Video

King Kong (franchise)
Amusement rides introduced in 2010
Amusement rides manufactured by Dynamic Structures
2010 3D films
2010 films
3D animated films
2010 science fiction films
Universal Parks & Resorts films
Universal Studios Hollywood
Universal Parks & Resorts attractions by name
Amusement rides based on film franchises
Animatronic attractions
2010 establishments in California